Richard Gabriel Marcone (born 21 January 1993) is an Italian footballer who plays for  club Avellino. Marcone received Italy youth national teams call-up in 2013.

Club career

Siena
Born in Bucharest, Romania Marcone started his professional career at Italian club Siena. He joined the Tuscan team from Esperia in temporary deal on 30 August 2007. The deal later turned to definitive deal. He was the member of the under-20 team in 2010–11 and 2011–12 season, and previously U17 youth team in 2008–09 and 2009–10 season. Marcone also occasionally worked with first team as fourth keeper in 2011–12 Serie A. He wore no.93 shirt, his year of birth.

Vicenza
In June 2012, the club decided to capitalise his potential market value. Despite no real buyer from Serie A and B clubs nor he could enter the first team immediately, the club used player exchange to give an accounting value to the player, in order to pass the financial benchmark of FIGC. He was swapped with Giulio Cavallari of Vicenza Calcio in co-ownership deal, while Marcone's team-mate Alessandro Iacobucci (keeper), who spent 2011–12 season in South Tyrol, were swapped to Parma along with Pacini and Rossi. Moreover the deal was completed on 29 June 2012, the second last day of 2011–12 financial year, which ended on 30 June. However, his new "market" value to his new club, would be a cost in term of amortization as a kind of intangible asset. Half of Marcone was "valued" €750,000 and Cavallari €768,000, made only €18,000 cash involved. Marcone signed a 3-year contract.

In July 2012, Marcone left for South Tyrol to replace Iacobucci, who left for Spezia, a Serie B club.

On the next day South Tyrol also signed Matteo Grandi from Cesena. Marcone successfully became the first choice and Grandi as deputy.

Trapani
In June 2013, Siena sold Marcone outright to Vicenza as well as Cavallari to Siena from Vicenza outright. However, both clubs once failed to register in Serie B (Siena) and Lega Pro Prima Divisione (Vicenza) On 10 July Vicenza finally acquired all the required document for the new season. However due to the present of former Italian under-21 internationals Carlo Pinsoglio who was the first choice of last season, Marcone was immediately left for Trapani Calcio in temporary deal with option to purchase.

On 10 July 2014 Trapani acquired Marcone outright for €200,000 and Daniele Martinelli outright for an undisclosed fee.

On 21 July 2015 Marcone was re-signed by Vicenza Calcio in a temporary deal, with an option to buy. He wore no.1 shirt.

On 26 January 2016 Marcone was signed by Serie A club Verona. He wore no.88 shirt.

On 12 July 2016 was re-signed by South Tyrol. On 31 August 2017 he left for Pro Vercelli.

Rieti
On 31 January 2019, he joined Rieti.

Ternana
On 13 September 2019 he joined Ternana on a one-year contract.

Potenza
On 18 November 2020, Marcone signed for Serie C club Potenza as a free transfer, re-joining his former Rieti boss Ezio Capuano, and making his debut on the same day in an away game against Palermo.

Avellino
On 7 July 2022, he joined Avellino on a two-year deal.

International career
In January 2013, Marcone received his first Italy U20 call-up for a training camp and a triangular tournament between U21, U20 and U19. However, he withdrew and replaced by Alfred Gomis of Torino. Previously he once received a call-up to a goalkeeper training camp in 2008, and younger than 17 out of 23 participant.

References

External links
 Football.it Profile 

1993 births
Footballers from Bucharest
Living people
Italian footballers
Italian people of Romanian descent
A.C.N. Siena 1904 players
F.C. Südtirol players
L.R. Vicenza players
Hellas Verona F.C. players
F.C. Pro Vercelli 1892 players
A.C. Cuneo 1905 players
F.C. Rieti players
Ternana Calcio players
Potenza Calcio players
U.S. Avellino 1912 players
Serie B players
Serie C players
Association football goalkeepers